Antonio Gausí Subías (10 December 1927 – 7 May 2021) was a Spanish professional footballer who played as a right winger.

Career
Born in Lleida, Gausí played for Ilerda, Leridano, Lérida, Real Madrid, Celta de Vigo, Zaragoza and Levante.

He obtained a degree in economics and had two spells as President of UE Lleida, from 1982 to 1986 and from 1998 to 2002.

References

1927 births
2021 deaths
Sportspeople from Lleida
Spanish footballers
Association football wingers
UE Lleida players
Real Madrid CF players
RC Celta de Vigo players
Real Zaragoza players
Levante UD footballers
Segunda División players
La Liga players
UE Lleida non-playing staff